Balázs is a Hungarian surname and male given name, equivalent to the name Blaise. Its feast day is on 3 of February. 

As a surname:
 Andre Balazs (born 1957), American hotelier and residential developer
 Árpád Balázs (born 1937), Hungarian classical music composer
 Attila Balázs (born 1988), Hungarian tennis player
 Béla Balázs (1884–1949), Hungarian-Jewish film critic and poet
 Endre Alexander Balazs (1920–2015), Hungarian-American in the New Jersey Inventors Hall of Fame
 Étienne Balázs (1905–1963), Hungarian-French sinologist
 Harold Balazs (1928–2017), American sculptor
 Janika Balázs (1925–1988), Serbian musician
 Márton Balázs, (1929–2016), Romanian mathematician of Hungarian descent
 Mihály Balázs (born 1948), Hungarian historian
 Nándor Balázs (1926–2003), Hungarian-American physicist
 Péter Balázs (born 1941), Hungarian politician
 Péter Balázs (canoeist) (born 1982), Hungarian canoeist
 Peter Balazs (mathematician), (born 1970), Austrian mathematician

As a given name:
 Balázs Orbán (1829–1890), Hungarian writer and politician
 Balázs Kiss (athlete) (born 1972), Hungarian Olympic athlete
 Balázs Ladányi (born 1976), Hungarian ice hockey player
 Balázs Taróczy (born 1954), Hungarian tennis player
 Balázs Borbély (born 1979), Hungarian footballer 
 Balázs Dzsudzsák (born 1986), Hungarian footballer
 Balázs Farkas-Jenser (born 1990), Hungarian singer and guitarist

Hungarian masculine given names
Hungarian-language surnames